Evolvulus is a genus of flowering plants in the Convolvulaceae, the morning glory family. They are known generally as dwarf morning glories. Most are native to the Americas. There are about 100 species.

Description
These plants are annual and perennial herbs and shrubs. They have non-twining stems. The leaves  have smooth edges. Flowers are borne singly or in small clusters, or sometimes in spikes. The corolla is round and flat or bell-shaped. The fruit is a capsule containing 1 to 4 seeds.

Taxonomy

Etymology
The genus name Evolvulus comes from the Latin word meaning "to unroll", inspired by its non-vining form.

Species
The following species are recognised in the genus Evolvulus:

Evolvulus alopecuroides
Evolvulus alsinoides - slender dwarf morning glory
Evolvulus altissimus
Evolvulus anagalloides
Evolvulus arbuscula
Evolvulus arenarius
Evolvulus arenicola
Evolvulus argyreus
Evolvulus arizonicus - wild dwarf morning glory, hairy evolvulus
Evolvulus aurigenius
Evolvulus barbatus
Evolvulus bogotensis
Evolvulus boliviensis
Evolvulus bracei House
Evolvulus bracei (Meisn.) Ooststr.
Evolvulus cardiophyllus
Evolvulus chamaepitys
Evolvulus chapadensis
Evolvulus choapanus
Evolvulus chrysotrichos
Evolvulus comosus
Evolvulus convolvuloides - bindweed dwarf morning glory
Evolvulus cordatus
Evolvulus corumbaensis
Evolvulus cressoides
Evolvulus daphnoides
Evolvulus delicatus
Evolvulus diosmoides
Evolvulus elaeagnifolius
Evolvulus elegans
Evolvulus ericifolius
Evolvulus fieldii
Evolvulus filipes - Maryland dwarf morning glory
Evolvulus flavus
Evolvulus flexuosus
Evolvulus frankenioides
Evolvulus fuscus
Evolvulus genistoides
Evolvulus glaziovii
Evolvulus glomeratus - Brazilian dwarf morning glory
Evolvulus gnaphalioides
Evolvulus goyazensis
Evolvulus grisebachii - Grisebach's dwarf morning glory
Evolvulus gypsophiloides
Evolvulus hallieri
Evolvulus harleyi
Evolvulus hasslerianus
Evolvulus helianthemifolius 
Evolvulus helianthemoides
Evolvulus helichrysoides
Evolvulus herrerae
Evolvulus hypocrateriflorus
Evolvulus incanus
Evolvulus jacobinus
Evolvulus kramerioides
Evolvulus lagopodioides
Evolvulus lagopus
Evolvulus lanatus
Evolvulus latifolius
Evolvulus linarioides
Evolvulus linoides
Evolvulus lithospermoides
Evolvulus luetzelburgii
Evolvulus macroblepharis
Evolvulus magnus
Evolvulus maximiliani
Evolvulus minimus
Evolvulus niveus
Evolvulus nummularius - agracejo rastrero
Evolvulus nuttallianus - shaggy dwarf morning glory
Evolvulus ovatus
Evolvulus paniculatus
Evolvulus passerinoides
Evolvulus peruvianus
Evolvulus phyllanthoides
Evolvulus piurensis 
Evolvulus pohlii
Evolvulus prostratus
Evolvulus pterocaulon
Evolvulus pterygophyllus
Evolvulus purpusii
Evolvulus pusillus
Evolvulus rariflorus
Evolvulus riedelii
Evolvulus rotundifolius
Evolvulus rufus
Evolvulus saxifragus
Evolvulus scoparioides
Evolvulus sericeus - silver dwarf morning glory
Evolvulus serpylloides
Evolvulus siliceus
Evolvulus simplex
Evolvulus speciosus
Evolvulus squamosus - rockyplains dwarf morning glory
Evolvulus stellariifolius
Evolvulus tenuis
Evolvulus thymiflorus
Evolvulus tomentosus
Evolvulus villosissimus
Evolvulus villosus
Evolvulus vimineus
Evolvulus weberbaueri

Gallery

References

External links

 Harms, B. Studies in Evolvulus. University of Texas Herbarium, Austin.
 Ramos Junqueira, M. E. and R. Simão-Bianchini. (2006). The genus Evolvulus L. (Convolvulaceae) in Morro do Chapéu Municipality, Bahia State, Brazil. Acta Botanica Brasilica 20(1) 157–72.

 
Convolvulaceae genera